Demmy Druyts (born 4 October 1995) is a Belgian racing cyclist, who currently rides for UCI Women's Continental Team . She rode at the 2014 UCI Road World Championships.

Druyts is from a sporting family: her father, Ronny, played youth football with Beerschot AC and at the senior level with Dynamo Niel, where he was a champion in the Belgian Provincial leagues, her sister Steffy was a multiple national champion in gymnastics, and she is the sister of racing cyclists Jessy Druyts, Kelly Druyts, Lenny Druyts and Gerry Druyts.

References

External links

1995 births
Living people
Belgian female cyclists
People from Wilrijk
Cyclists from Antwerp
21st-century Belgian women